Mandarin News Australia was a news and current affairs service on the Special Broadcasting Service (SBS) for the Australian Chinese community and the broader Australian audience.

Mandarin News Australia was Australia's first and only free to air, locally produced in-language Mandarin news service. This program delivered relevant news and current affairs to one of Australia's largest language communities and the wider community. The program covered national and international stories, ranging from major political and business news, local Chinese and Australian arts, cultural, community and sports events. The program also featured weekly profile pieces on inspiring locals and successful identities, including Kevin Rudd, Yao Ming, the Dalai Lama, super sleuth Dr Henry Lee, China's academic superstar, Yu Dan and The Sun King: Shi Zhengrong.

The program aired on SBS Two on Wednesdays at 5:30pm with English subtitles, and repeated on SBS One on Sundays at 6.30am. Mandarin News Australia was presented by Zhou Li and Amy Chien-Yu Wang, who also worked as a video journalist on the program. The production team consisted of video journalist, Jason Jin, World News Australia journalist, Cassandra Hill, video producer, Phil Austin and Executive Producer, Liz Deep-Jones.

External links
Official website
Program launch details

Australian television news shows
Special Broadcasting Service original programming
2010 Australian television series debuts
2012 Australian television series endings
Chinese television news shows
Mandarin-language television shows